The 2016 Monterrey Open was a women's tennis tournament played on outdoor hard courts. It was the 8th edition of the Monterrey Open and an International tournament on the 2016 WTA Tour. It took place at the Club Sonoma in Monterrey, Mexico, from 29 February to 6 March 2016.

Points and prize money

Point distribution

Prize money 

*per team

Singles main draw entrants

Seeds 

1 Rankings as of February 22, 2016.

Other entrants 
The following players received wildcards into the main draw:
  Victoria Rodríguez
  Francesca Schiavone
  Marcela Zacarías

The following players received entry from the qualifying draw:
  Petra Martić
  Nicole Gibbs
  Julia Glushko
  Pauline Parmentier

Withdrawals 
Before the tournament
  Victoria Azarenka → replaced by  Magdaléna Rybáriková
  Madison Keys → replaced by  Irina Falconi
  Karin Knapp → replaced by  Tatjana Maria
  Laura Robson → replaced by  Heather Watson
  Coco Vandeweghe → replaced by  Mariana Duque Mariño

Retirements 

  Christina Mchale (dizziness)

Doubles main draw entrants

Seeds 

 Rankings as of February 22, 2016.

Other entrants 
The following pairs received wildcards into the doubles main draw:
  Andrea Gámiz /  Ana Sofía Sánchez
  Victoria Rodríguez /  Renata Zarazúa

Champions

Singles 

  Heather Watson def.  Kirsten Flipkens 3–6, 6–2, 6–3

Doubles 

  Anabel Medina Garrigues /  Arantxa Parra Santonja def.  Petra Martić /  Maria Sanchez 4–6, 7–5, [10–7]

References

External links 
 Official website

2016 WTA Tour
2016
2016 in Mexican tennis